Sottovuoto generazionale is a debut album by Dari. Two singles have been released, Wale (tanto wale) and Tutto regolare. The CD sold about 20000 copies.

Track listing 
 Wale (Tanto Wale)
 Tutto Regolare
 Predisposta (A Lasciare il Tuo Posto)
 Come M'Hai
 Per Piacere
 Cambio Destinazione
 Non Pensavo
 GP A 100 All'Ora
 Moltiplicato 10
 Ho Spaccato
 Minimale Maxibene
 Play and Stop

All tracks except 2, 3 and 12 are re-recordings of older songs.

Notes 

2008 debut albums